"Gasolina" is a song on Daddy Yankee's 2004 album Barrio Fino. It features uncredited vocals from Glory, who sings the line "dame más gasolina" (meaning "Give me more gasoline"). The song was released as the album's lead single in October 2004 and became a hit in 2005, peaking inside the top 10 on some of the charts it entered. "Gasolina" is the first reggaeton song to be nominated for the Latin Grammy Award for Record of the Year. In 2015, the song reached the number nine position on the "50 Greatest Latin Songs of All Time" list according to Billboard. In 2018, it was ranked number 38 on Rolling Stone 50 Greatest Latin Pop Songs. In 2017, it was included on Billboards "12 Best Dancehall & Reggaeton Choruses of the 21st Century" at number eight. In 2021, it was ranked number 50 on Rolling Stone "500 Greatest Songs of All Time", and a year later it was ranked at the first place on their 2022 "100 Greatest Reggaeton Songs of All Time" list.

Background
"Gasolina" was composed in 2003 by Daddy Yankee and Eddie Dee, assisted by a production duo known as Luny Tunes. Daddy Yankee's album Barrio Fino was released in July 2004, containing the song "Gasolina". At the beginning of August, Daddy Yankee shot a video for the song in the Dominican Republic's capital city, Santo Domingo, at the Autodrómo Internacional de Las Américas motorsports track and in the historic center of town, the Zona Colonial. The song was released as a single in the US in October 2004, supported by a television appearance by Daddy Yankee on MTV's Total Request Live on November 4, when the video was introduced. By November 6, WSKQ-FM in New York City reported "Gasolina" in their top 10 rotation, and WRTO-FM in Florida said the song was their number one most-played track. It entered the US Billboard Hot 100 chart a week later, rising to number 32 on January 28, 2005. "Gasolina" was a hit in North America and the Caribbean, gaining Daddy Yankee popularity among Latino mainstream music fans. On July 4, 2005, "Gasolina" was released as a single in the UK, eventually earning a Silver certification in March 2019. Australia saw the single enter their charts in late January 2006 during their summer season, rising to number 12. Enjoying worldwide success, "Gasolina" is one of the songs attributed with opening the door for reggaeton and creating a pathway for other stars in reggaeton.

Charts

Weekly charts

Year-end charts

Sales and certifications

Release history

Uses in the media and live performances
 During his performance at the 2005 Lo Nuestro Awards, Daddy Yankee came into the show in a red Lamborghini, which was pulled down from the roof of American Airlines Arena in Miami, while singing "Gasolina". This moment was voted as the best moment of the show by online voters at Univision's website.
 The song was featured in the 2006 comedy films, The Benchwarmers and Fast Food Nation.
 The song was used as a warm-up song by pitcher Johan Santana during his time with the New York Mets and by former Texas Rangers closer Neftalí Feliz, as well as Julio Lugo's music.
 The song was used in a TV advertising for the 2006 Citroën C2, which ran through the spring and summer of 2005.
 At a campaign stop for Republican presidential nominee John McCain, Daddy Yankee endorsed McCain and performed this song live for students at Phoenix's Central High. A New York Times blogger has questioned if McCain and his campaign understood the song's double-entendres.
 The song is used in a portion of the Studio Tour in Universal Studios Hollywood.
 The song was used on seventh week of Dancing with the Stars as the music for James Maslow and his professional partner Peta Murgatroyd's during the night.
 The song was used as MMA fighter Eddie Sanchez's entrance theme at UFC 67: All or Nothing.
 The song was used in the 2007 Indian Tamil-language action film, Sivaji: The Boss.

Papa A.P. version 

Salvadoran singer Papa A.P. released a cover version of "Gasolina" in Europe in 2005. It caused some controversy for being released there prior to Daddy Yankee's version, which had been released the previous year in the United States. It was the first single from his second studio album, Assesina.

Papa A.P. said that he initially refused to release the single before Daddy Yankee but was convinced to do so by his producers. He said about his version: "I do not regret that choice because even if it's not my title, everyone has very well accepted my version, even in the hood of New York". He claims his producers "came to an arrangement" with Daddy Yankee's producers. One week after the recording, his producer proposed shooting a music video, which was eventually shot in Tunisia.

His first European hit, the song reached the top 10 in France, and also charted elsewhere around Europe.

Track listings 
CD single
 "Gasolina" (radio mix) – 3:13
 "Gasolina" (bikes club mix) – 4:45
 "La noche" – 3:30

CD maxi
 "Gasolina" (radio dy bikes) – 3:15
 "Gasolina" (club dy bikes) – 4:46
 "La noche" – 3:30
 "Gasolina" (video)

CD maxi – Finland
 "Gasolina" (radio mix bikes) – 3:14
 "Gasolina" (club mix bikes) – 4:45

12-inch maxi
 "Gasolina" – 3:13
 "Gasolina" (club mix) – 4:44
 "Gasolina" (bikes club mix) – 4:45
 "La Noche" – 3:30

Certifications

Charts

Other cover versions and remixes 
 The song was remixed in late 2004 by DJ Buddha, featuring Pitbull and N.O.R.E., and was also a smash hit. Later, Lil Jon mixed his own vocals to the remix, which is featured on the Crunk Juice remix CD.
This song was also recorded by La Fabrica and released in Europe before the song's official release by Daddy Yankee. La Fabrica's version peaked at number three in Greece before the original "Gasolina" was released.

References

External links
 
 Daddy Yankee's official site
 Daddy Yankee on Deezer

2004 singles
2005 singles
2006 singles
Number-one singles in Venezuela
Spanish-language songs
Daddy Yankee songs
Pitbull (rapper) songs
Papa A.P. songs
Songs written by Daddy Yankee
Song recordings produced by Luny Tunes
2004 songs
Universal Music Group singles
Songs written by Eddie Dee